Qeshlaq-e Zeynal-e Olya (also Romanized as Qeshlāq-e Zeynāl-e ‘Olyā; also known as Qeshlāq-e Zeynāl) is a village in Qeshlaq-e Jonubi Rural District, Qeshlaq Dasht District, Bileh Savar County, Ardabil Province, Iran. At the 2006 census, its population was 27, in 7 families.

References 

Populated places in Bileh Savar County
Towns and villages in Bileh Savar County